Rafał Rosolski (born 27 May 1991) is a Polish canoeist. He competed in the men's K-1 1000 metres event at the 2016 Summer Olympics.

References

External links
 

1991 births
Living people
Polish male canoeists
Olympic canoeists of Poland
Canoeists at the 2016 Summer Olympics
Sportspeople from Gorzów Wielkopolski
European Games competitors for Poland
Canoeists at the 2019 European Games